Special Dead is a 2006 American zombie comedy film directed by Thomas L. Phillips and Sean Simmons, written by Jared Tweedie, and starring Jason Brubaker, Amy Wade, Gia Natale, Anthony Rutowicz, and Haneka Haynes.

Plot 
When a group of hikers break into a mine shaft and drink contaminated water, they turn into ravenous zombies.  The zombies rapidly overrun a nearby camp for the developmentally disabled that has had previous issues with zombie attacks.  The counselors and campers, who have an antagonistic relationship, attempt to survive the assault.

Cast 
 Jason Brubaker as Machiavelli Stone
 Amy Wade as Cassie Hewitt
 Gia Franzia as Dale Stone
 Anthony Rutowicz as Todd Slater
 Haneka Haynes as Harley Jacquette

Release 
Special Dead premiered at the Hollywood Film Festival on October 20, 2006.  It was released on DVD in October 2007.

Reception 
Bloody Disgusting rated it 2.5/5 stars and wrote that the execution did not live up to the premise.  Eric Campos of Film Threat rated it 3.5/5 stars and called it "a fun, trashy ride".  Peter Dendle wrote that it is "back-of-the-schoolbus jabs at the disabled, presented as a veneer over a splatter movie with lousy zombies".

References

External links 
 
 

2006 films
2006 horror films
American zombie films
American independent films
American splatter films
Films about summer camps
2000s English-language films
2000s American films